Tydus Oran Winans (born July 26, 1972) is a former American football wide receiver in the National Football League for the Washington Redskins and the Cincinnati Bengals.  He played college football at Fresno State University.

Early life
Winans attended Carson High School in Carson, California and a letterman in high school football.  In football, as a senior, he was named as a second-team All-South Bay selection by the Los Angeles Times.

External links
 

1972 births
Living people
American football wide receivers
Washington Redskins players
Cincinnati Bengals players
Fresno State Bulldogs football players
Players of American football from Los Angeles
San Francisco Demons players
Carson High School (Carson, California) alumni